The 1992 Los Angeles Rams season was the team's 55th year with the National Football League and the 47th season in Los Angeles. In a scheduling quirk, the Rams' first four opponents were all AFC East teams. The Rams' final twelve games were against only NFC teams.

According to Football Outsiders, the 1992 Rams had the second-worst run-defense they had ever tracked. The Rams allowed 383 points, the second most in the league in 1992. The Rams were also second-worst in the league in total allowed yards (5,523), allowed rushing yards (2,230), and yards per rushing attempt (4.8).

The Rams' first four games were vs. the AFC East, the first time a team played four inter-conference games to begin a season since the AFL-NFL merger. This was repeated two years later by the Kansas City Chiefs.

Offseason

NFL Draft

Personnel

Staff

Roster

Regular season

Schedule

Standings

See also
Other Anaheim–based teams in 1992
 California Angels (Anaheim Stadium)
 1992 California Angels season

References

External links
 1992 Los Angeles Rams at Pro-Football-Reference.com

Los Angeles Rams
Los Angeles Rams seasons
Los Ang